The 1926–27 League of Ireland was the sixth season of the League of Ireland. 

Shamrock Rovers won their third title.

Overview

It began on 21 August 1926 and ended on 7 May 1927. Shelbourne were the defending champions.

Team changes
Pioneers were not re-elected to the League, while Dundalk GNR were elected.

Teams

Table

Results

Top goalscorers

Source:

See also
1926–27 FAI Cup

References

Ireland
League Of Ireland, 1926-27
League of Ireland seasons